Lorenzo Demetrio Zanetti (born 10 August 1987) is an Italian motorcycle racer. He currently races in the CIV Superbike Championship, aboard a Ducati 1199 Panigale.

Racing career
Born in Brescia, Zanetti finished second behind Luca Di Giuseppe in the Honda RS125 GP Trophy in 2003 and won the title the following year. In the same seasons he competed in the Italian 125 GP Championship and in 2004 he made his debut in the 125cc World Championship; he raced in the latter series until the end of 2009. In 2010 he was second in the Italian Stock 600 Championship and debuted in the FIM Superstock 1000 Cup, which he finished in third position in 2011. For 2012 he moved to the Superbike World Championship and then in 2013 to the Supersport World Championship. On 21 July 2013, during the race held in Moscow, he was involved in the accident which resulted in the death of Andrea Antonelli. He continued to race in the same championship for 2014, 2015 and 2016.

Racing record

Career summary

Italian championship results taken from storicociv.perugiatiming.com
125cc results taken from MotoGP.com
Superstock 1000, Superbike and Supersport results taken from WorldSBK.com

Grand Prix motorcycle racing

Races by year
(key) (Races in bold indicate pole position, races in italics indicate fastest lap)

Superbike World Championship

Races by year
(key) (Races in bold indicate pole position, races in italics indicate fastest lap)

Supersport World Championship

Races by year
(key) (Races in bold indicate pole position, races in italics indicate fastest lap)
(key)

References

External links

Italian motorcycle racers
Living people
1987 births
125cc World Championship riders
Superbike World Championship riders
FIM Superstock 1000 Cup riders
Sportspeople from Brescia
Supersport World Championship riders